Marshall is an unincorporated community in central Marshall Township, Highland County, Ohio, United States. It lies at the intersection of State Routes 124 and 506. Rocky Fork Lake, the site of Rocky Fork State Park, is located 2 miles (3 km) to the north. Marshall lies 8 miles (11 km) east-southeast of the city of Hillsboro, the county seat of Highland County. An early name was West Liberty, changed to Marshall because of a US Post Office requirement. The village had also been known colloquially as Slab-Town in its early years.   

The Marshall school, as it is remembered today, was built on the site of an earlier small school-house on the crest of a hill near the center of the village. The "new" school was built around 1918 by local contractor, Don Main. The new building featured three classrooms, a second-floor office for the principle, and a library/study-hall. Within a few years, a recently abandoned school building from nearby Harriett, Ohio was moved and attached to the south side of the Marshall School.  This greatly expanded the size of the Marshall structure, as the additional space was used for a cafeteria, a large kitchen, and two additional classrooms. 

The Marshall High School Red Flashes were the Class B State Basketball Champions in 1928. As a result, the gymnasium at the school was constructed in 1931. In addition to the gym, the 1931 building included two more classrooms (totaling seven classrooms for the small school), two sports locker-rooms, and (for the first time) indoor bathrooms for students and basketball spectators.  

The final class to graduate from Marshall High School was in spring 1960, when the school was consolidated into the Hillsboro City School District. From that point forward, students from Marshall have attended Hillsboro High School, 8 miles west. An elementary school (grades 1-6) remained at Marshall for children of the community until spring 1970. From fall 1970 until approximately the year 2000, the Marshall school was used as a sixth-grade facility for children from the entire Hillsboro City School District. In late-2011, the 1918 school building was demolished. The 1931 gymnasium building remains as a community center.   

In addition to the school, other institutions in Marshall (over the years) have included the following -- Churches: United Methodist Church, Church of Christ, Presbyterian Church (stopped meeting early-1970s), Church of Christ in Christian Union (dissolved late-1920s), and Harriet United Missionary Church (in nearby Harriett, Ohio). Civic and Fraternal Organizations: Odd Fellows Lodge and Knights of Pythias Lodge (both likely dissolved early-1930s), Marshall Township Volunteer Fire Department, Marshall School PTA (dissolved 1970), Marshall Twig (dissolved late-1960s), and Marshall Homemaker's Club (dissolved 1966). 4-H clubs have existed in Marshall for nearly a century under various club-names (early 4-H clubs included Marshall Junior Farmers and Marshall Future Homemakers).   

Businesses in Marshall (over the years) have included: Marshall Quarry, Kelley's Grocery, Martin's Tomato Farm, Wisecup's General Store, Clark's Market, C.H. Main & Son Excavating, Hunter Meats, Marshall Mini-Mart, Seller's Orchard, a blacksmith (south-west corner of Rt 124 and Rt 506), a medical doctor's practice (north-west corner of Rt 124 and Rt 506), Blue Ribbon Farm, Barnyard Cafe, Horton's Tomato Farm, McCoppin's Mill, South Beach Store, Francis Marine, and Shoemaker's General Store (in nearby Harriett, Ohio).

Gallery

Notable Persons - born in Marshall, graduated from Marshall School, or lived in the community for lengthy period: 
Charles P. Cary; Wisconsin Superintendent of Public Instruction
Paul C. Hayes; President of Rio Grande College
Louis C. "Chet" Miller; President of Southern State Community College
Eloise Martin Yochum; Chief Executive Officer, Highland District Hospital. Highland County Women's Hall of Fame, 1987
Henry G. Williams; President of Wilmington College
Thurman "Dusty" Miller; editor of Wilmington News Journal
Dr. Ronald M. Gustin; family physician, Hillsboro, Ohio 
Fay Gustin; Highland County Sheriff, elected 1945
Hugh Rogers; Highland County Sheriff, elected 1977
Judge Oliver Hughes (born 1863); Adjutant General State of Ohio, Public Utilities Commission State of Ohio

References

Unincorporated communities in Highland County, Ohio
Unincorporated communities in Ohio